The 2019–20 CAF Confederation Cup group stage started on 1 December 2019 and ended on 2 February 2020. A total of 16 teams competed in the group stage to decide the eight places in the knockout stage of the 2019–20 CAF Confederation Cup.

Draw
The draw for the group stage was held on 12 November 2019, 12:00 CAT (UTC+2), at the CAF headquarters in Cairo, Egypt. The 16 teams, all winners of the play-off round of qualifying, were drawn into four groups of four.

The teams were seeded by their performances in the CAF competitions for the previous five seasons (CAF 5-Year Ranking points shown in parentheses). Each group contained one team from Pot 1, one team from Pot 2 and two teams from Pot 3, and each team was drawn into one of the positions in their group.

Format
In each group, teams play against each other home-and-away in a round-robin format. The group winners and runners-up advance to the quarter-finals of the knockout stage.

Tiebreakers
Teams are ranked according to points (3 points for a win, 1 point for a draw, 0 points for a loss). If tied on points, tiebreakers are applied in the following order (Regulations III. 20 & 21):
Points in head-to-head matches among tied teams;
Goal difference in head-to-head matches among tied teams;
Goals scored in head-to-head matches among tied teams;
Away goals scored in head-to-head matches among tied teams;
If more than two teams are tied, and after applying all head-to-head criteria above, a subset of teams are still tied, all head-to-head criteria above are reapplied exclusively to this subset of teams;
Goal difference in all group matches;
Goals scored in all group matches;
Away goals scored in all group matches;
Drawing of lots.

Schedule
The schedule of each matchday is as follows. Effective from the Confederation Cup group stage, matches are played on Sundays. Kick-off times are fixed at 13:00, 16:00 and 19:00 GMT.

Note: Positions for scheduling do not use the seeding pots, e.g. Team 1 is not necessarily the team from Pot 1 in the draw.

Groups
Times are GMT as listed by CAF (local times, even if not different, are in parentheses).

Group A

Group B

Group C

Group D

Notes

References

External links
Total CAF Confederation Cup, CAFonline.com
CAF Total Confederation Cup 2019/20

2
December 2019 sports events in Africa
January 2020 sports events in Africa
February 2020 sports events in Africa